Dejongia californicus is a moth of the family Pterophoridae. It is found in North America, including California and the south-eastern United States.

The larvae feed on Asteraceae species, including Isocoma veneta and Grindelia species.

References

Oxyptilini
Moths described in 1880
Endemic fauna of the United States
Moths of North America
Taxa named by Thomas de Grey, 6th Baron Walsingham